is a city located in Saga Prefecture on the island of Kyushu, Japan.  Its name, formed from the Japanese word roots 唐 kara (China, or continental East Asia in general), and 津 tsu (port), signifies its historical importance as an ancient trading port between Japan with China and Korea. The central area of Karatsu, which does not include the former cities and villages of Higashimatsuura District, has a population of 78,386. As of January 1, 2020, the city had an estimated population of 117,663 and a population density of 241 persons per km2. The total area is 487.59 km2.

On January 1, 2005, the towns of Chinzei, Hamatama, Hizen, Kyūragi, Ōchi, Yobuko and the village of Kitahata (all from Higashimatsuura District) were merged into Karatsu.

On January 1, 2006, the village of Nanayama (from Higashimatsuura District) was merged into Karatsu.

Geography 
Due to its proximity to mainland Asia, Karatsu has long been known as a stopover to Korea and China.
 Mountains: Mt. Sakurei (887.1 m), Mt. Hachiman (763.6 m), Mt. Tonbo (535 m)
 Natural Parks: Hachimandake Prefectural Natural Park, Sefuri-Kitayama Prefectural Natural Park, Tenzan Prefectural Natural Park

Adjoining municipalities 
 Saga Prefecture
 Genkai
 Imari
 Saga
 Takeo
 Taku
 Fukuoka Prefecture
 Itoshima

Climate

History 
Under ritsuryō, the current city area was part of the Hizen Province. In 1591, on the coast of the northern part of the city (formerly the town of Chinzei), Nagoya Castle was constructed. The following year, it became the location from which the Imjin War was launched by Toyotomi Hideyoshi. In the middle of 1593, Terazawa Hirotaka created the Karatsu Domain and began governing it. In 1602, replacing Nagoya Castle, Karatsu Castle was constructed in what is now the heart of Karatsu. The tower of Karatsu Castle was built in 1966 .
 1889-04-01 - The modern municipal system was established. The current city region is occupied by 1 town (Karatsu), and 19 villages (Hamasaki, Irino, Kagami, Karatsu, Kirigo, Kitahata, Kuri, Kyūragi, Minato, Mitsushima, Nagoya, Nanayama, Ōchi, Ōmura, Onizuka, Sashi, Uchiage and Yobuko).
 1896-07-28 - Ōmura was renamed Tamashima.
 1922-07-01 - Hamasaki was elevated to town status.
 1922-11-01 - Nagoya changes the kanji of its name.
 1924-01-01 - Mitsushima was incorporated into Karatsu Town.
 1928-08-01 - Yobuko was elevated to town status.
 1931-02-01 - Karatsu Village was incorporated into Karatsu Town.
 1932-01-01 - Karatsu Town was elevated to city status.
 1935-09-01 - Sashi and Ōchi both were elevated to town status.
 1941-11-03 - Sashi was incorporated into Karatsu.
 1952-05-03 - Kyūragi was elevated to town status.
 1954-11-01 - Kagami, Kuri, Minato and Onizuka were all incorporated into Karatsu.
 1956-09-30 - Hamasaki and Tamashima were merged to create the town of Hamasaki-Tamashima; and Nagoya and Uchiage were merge to create the town of Chinzei.
 1958-11-01 - Kirigo was split and its parts were incorporated into Karatsu and Irino (respectively), and Irino was elevated to town status and was renamed Hizen.
 1966-11-01 - Hamasaki-Tamashima was renamed Hamatama.
 2005-01-01 - Karatsu merged with Chinzei, Hamatama, Hizen, Kitahata, Kyūragi, Ōchi and Yobuko to retain the name Karatsu.
 2006-01-01 - Nanayama was incorporated into Karatsu.

Culture and tourism 
The graceful Karatsu Castle stands watch over this castle town.

Karatsu is famous for its Karatsu Kunchi festival, which runs annually from November 2 to November 4 and is visited by approximately 500,000 visitors from all over Japan.  The festival consists of 14 hikiyama (floats made of many layers of paper mache) being carried around the city's narrow streets to calls of "Enya!".  Some hikiyama members say "Yoisa!". This accompaniment is one of the 100 Soundscapes of Japan.  Regularly during Karatsu Kunchi, people in this town open their homes to friends and strangers to eat and drink; the primary focus is enjoying food, beer, and shochu, and having lively conversation.

In between Karatsu Station (唐津駅) and the main bus centre (大手口バスセンター) is a 170-metre arcade containing many small shops that specialize in Karatsu Kunchi omiyage, and the Korean-influenced local pottery which are called "Karatsu ware" since they refer to Japanese ceramic wares of Korean origin. The actual date of production of the 'Karatsu Yaki' is believed to have begun being produced sometime "during the first half of the 16th century in the late Muromachi period."

Museums in Karatsu include Kawamura Art Museum, Saga Prefectural Nagoya Castle Museum, and Matsurokan, and shrines, Kagami Jinja.

Yobuko 
The former town of Yobuko merged with Karatsu on January 1, 2005.

Yobuko is famed for its fresh squid, Ika (烏賊) (いか） in Japanese, which is offered sashimi style, or it can be eaten while the squid is still alive.  Yobuko also attracts local tourists, who come to see the Yobuko Big Bridge (呼子大橋).

Yobuko has a festival known as Yobuko Tsunahiki (呼子大綱引), or the Yobuko Tug of War, which takes place annually on the first Saturday and Sunday of June.  The event involves a big tug-o-war between two factions in the town, the fishermen and farmers, and local legend says that if the hills faction wins, there will be a good harvest that year; and if the sea faction wins, there will be a good fishing harvest that year.

Beaches 
Hamatama is one of the nicest beaches in Saga Prefecture. It is located close to central Karatsu and can be accessed by the JR Chikuhi Line.

Sister cities 
  Reihoku, Kumamoto, Japan
  Yangzhou, China
  Yeosu, South Korea
  Seogwipo, South Korea

Education

Prefectural senior high schools 
 Karatsu Commercial High School
 Karatsu Higashi High School
 Karatsu Minami High School
 Karatsu Nishi High School
 Karatsu Seisho High School
 Karatsu Technical High School
 Kyūragi High School

Municipal junior high and elementary schools 
 Junior high schools: 25
 Elementary schools: 44

National vocational schools 
 Karatsu Maritime Polytechnical School

Schools for the handicapped 
 Saga Prefectural Hokubu School for the Handicapped

Transportation

Air 
The closest airports are Saga Airport and Fukuoka Airport.

Rail 
 JR Kyūshū
 Karatsu Line
 Kyūragi Station - Iwaya Station - Ōchi Station - Honmutabe Station - Yamamoto Station - Onizuka Station - Karatsu Station - Nishi-Karatsu Station
 Chikuhi Line (connected with the Fukuoka City Subway Kūkō Line)
 (from Fukuoka) Hamasaki Station - Nijinomatsubara Station - Higashi-Karatsu Station - Watada Station - Karatsu Station
 (to Imari) Honmutabe Station - Hizen-Kubo Station - Nishi-Ōchi Station - Sari Station

Road 
 Expressways:
 Nishi-Kyūshū Expressway
 National highways:
 Route 202
 Route 203
 Route 204
 Route 323
 Route 382
 Major Prefectural roads:
 Karatsu-Yobiko Route 23
 Imari-Hatagawachi-Kyūragi Route 32
 Karatsu-Hizen Route 33
 Kyūragi-Fuji Route 37
 Ōchi-Yamauchi Route 38
 Hamatama-Ōchi Route 40
 Hizen-Yobiko Route 47
 Karatsu-Kitahata Route 50
 Yamamoto-Hatatsu Route 52

Notable people
 Ken Hisatomi (Footballer)
 Takeshi Kamura (Badminton player)

In popular culture
Karatsu is the setting for two manga and anime series, Yuri on Ice and Zombieland Saga.

References

External links 

 Karatsu City official website 
 Karatsu City official website 
 

 
Cities in Saga Prefecture
Port settlements in Japan
Populated coastal places in Japan